Long Glade Farm, also known as Short Glade Farm and Springdale Farm, is a historic plantation house and farm located near Mount Solon, Augusta County, Virginia. The house was built in 1852, and a two-story, three bay, "I-house" form brick dwelling in the Greek Revival style. It has an original rear ell.  The front facade features a reconstructed front porch with Doric order columns and a balustrade. Also on the property are a contributing meat house, former slaves quarters, a corn crib, a bank barn, a pig house, and a family cemetery.

It was listed on the National Register of Historic Places in 1996.

References

Plantation houses in Virginia
Houses on the National Register of Historic Places in Virginia
Farms on the National Register of Historic Places in Virginia
Greek Revival houses in Virginia
Houses completed in 1852
Houses in Augusta County, Virginia
National Register of Historic Places in Augusta County, Virginia
1852 establishments in Virginia
Slave cabins and quarters in the United States